St. Kevin's College (Irish Coláiste Chaomhín) is a Roman Catholic day secondary school for boys in Ballygall, which is located between Finglas (3 km) and Glasnevin (2 km)
on the northside of Dublin, Ireland. St. Kevins College was founded in 1967 by the Christian Brothers and is now under the trusteeship of the Edmund Rice Schools Trust (ERST). The school is dedicated to St. Kevin of Glendalough, the patron saint of Dublin and is built on lands previously owned by the Ball family in the 16th century.  The current principal is Sarah Barry. The school has approx. 550 students.

The school offers the Junior Certificate, an optional Transition Year, the Leaving Certificate, Leaving Certificate
Applied (LCA) and the Leaving Certificate Vocational Programme. St Kevin's College participates in the Delivering Equality of Opportunity in Schools (DEIS) initiative and the School Completion Programme. A recent Department of Education and Skills report described the quality of teaching and learning at St.  Kevin's College as good or very good with some instances of excellent practice.

Notable alumni

Arts, humanities and religion
 Senator Tom Clonan, former Captain in the Irish Army, academic and journalist
 Gavin Friday, musician and actor
 Prof. James O'Higgins Norman, academic and author

Sports
 James McCarthy, Dublin Senior Gaelic footballer
 David O'Leary, manager and former professional footballer (Arsenal and Republic of Ireland)
 Pierce O'Leary, former professional footballer (Shamrock Rovers, Celtic and Republic of Ireland)
 Keith O'Neill, former professional footballer (Coventry City and Republic of Ireland)
 Barney Rock, former Dublin Senior Gaelic footballer i
 Stephen Kelly (footballer, born 1983), former professional footballer (Tottenham Hotspur, Fulham and Republic of Ireland)

References

External links

Sam day at Kevin's! - Herald.ie

Ballygall
Secondary schools in County Dublin